Héctor Gros Espiell (17 September 1926 in Montevideo – 30 November 2009) was a Uruguayan jurist, politician and diplomat. He served as Minister of Foreign Affairs 1990–1993, during the government of Luis Alberto Lacalle. In 2005 he was Ambassador to France. He also served as judge of the Inter-American Court of Human Rights. In the United Nations, he was a Special Representative of the Secretary-General for Western Sahara.

Gros Espiell was a specialist in international law, particularly international human rights law and international criminal law. He was a lifelong member of the National Party.

His last important professional activity was at The Hague, in the Uruguay River pulp mill dispute.

References

1926 births
2009 deaths
People from Montevideo
Uruguayan jurists
International criminal law scholars
National Party (Uruguay) politicians
Foreign ministers of Uruguay
Ambassadors of Uruguay to France
Recipients of the Order of Isabella the Catholic
Members of the Uruguayan Academy of Language
Inter-American Court of Human Rights judges
Uruguayan judges
Politicians from Montevideo
Scholars of criminal law
Uruguayan judges of international courts and tribunals